Wernher is both a surname and a given name. Notable people with the name include:

People with the surname 
 Georgina Wernher, birth surname of British aristocrat
 Harold Augustus Wernher (1893–1973)
 Julius Wernher (1850–1912), German-born British Randlord and entrepreneur
 Wernher baronets, an extinct Baronetcy
 Lady Zia Wernher,  elder daughter of Grand Duke Michael Mikhailovich of Russia

People with the given name 
 Bruder Wernher (fl. 1225–1250), poet
 Wernher von Braun (1912–1977), rocketry pioneer in Nazi Germany and subsequently the United States
 Wernher Schodeler (1490–1541), Swiss chronicler
 Wernher Steiner (1492–1542), chronicler of Zug
 Wernher von Homberg (1284–1320), knight

See also
Wernher Collection, an art collection housed at Ranger's House near London, England
Wernher Open Pairs, an American bridge event
Wernher Triptych, an ivory Byzantine triptych
Werner (disambiguation)
Verner (name)
Werner (name)

German masculine given names